Sanbornite is a rare barium phyllosilicate mineral with formula BaSi2O5. Sanbornite is a colorless to white to pale green, platey orthorhombic mineral with Mohs hardness of 5 and a specific gravity of 3.74.

It was first described from Incline, Mariposa County, California in 1932 and named for mineralogist Frank B. Sanborn (1862–1936).

See also
List of minerals
List of minerals named after people

Footnotes

References
Mindat w/ locations
Webmineral w/ images
Mineral galleries

Barium minerals
Phyllosilicates
Orthorhombic minerals
Minerals in space group 62